Holla Bend Township was a township of Pope County, Arkansas. It was created from parts of Galla Rock and Illinois Townships.

References
 United States Board on Geographic Names (GNIS)
 United States National Atlas

External links
 US-Counties.com

Townships in Pope County, Arkansas
Populated places established in 1876
Townships in Arkansas
1876 establishments in Arkansas